Holly Lawrence (born 25 February 1990) is a triathlete who competed for Wales in the mixed relay event at the 2014 Commonwealth Games, and won the 2016 Ironman 70.3 World Championship. Lawrence is a fraternal triplet, and lives in Santa Monica, California.

Career
Lawrence began competing in the UK at the age of 17-18. Lawrence competed in the 2014 European Triathlon Championships; she finished eleventh in the individual event, and third in the mixed team relay. She competed for Wales in the mixed relay event at the 2014 Commonwealth Games, finishing eighth. She began competing in Ironman 70.3 events in 2015. Lawrence won the 2016 Ironman 70.3 World Championship in Mooloolaba, Queensland, Australia, in a time of four hours, nine minutes and 11 seconds. In the same year, she won three other Ironman 70.3 events, including one in Beijing. In 2017, Lawrence signed for the Trek Factory Racing triathlon team. She came second at the 2019 Ironman 70.3 World Championship, finishing behind Daniela Ryf.

References

1990 births
Welsh female triathletes
Triathletes at the 2014 Commonwealth Games
Living people
Commonwealth Games competitors for Wales
Triplets
Welsh twins
Twin sportspeople
Alumni of Swansea University
English female triathletes
Sportspeople from Somerset
People from South Somerset (district)
British expatriate sportspeople in the United States